WNBV is a Southern Gospel-formatted broadcast radio station licensed to Grundy, Virginia, serving Grundy and Vansant in Virginia. WNBV is owned and operated by Earl Cole, through licensee Jewell Valley Railroad, Inc.

References

External links
 

2009 establishments in Virginia
Southern Gospel radio stations in the United States
NBV
Radio stations established in 2009
Buchanan County, Virginia